Novonikolayevka is a rural locality (a selo) in Kuptsovskoye Rural Settlement, Kotovsky District, Volgograd Oblast, Russia. The population was 268 as of 2010. There are 4 streets.

Geography 
Novonikolayevka is located in forest steppe, on Volga Upland, on the left bank of the Mokraya Olkhovka River, 36 km southeast of Kotovo (the district's administrative centre) by road. Petrov Val is the nearest rural locality.

References 

Rural localities in Kotovsky District